Confusarin is a phenanthrenoid found in the orchids Eria confusa and Bulbophyllum reptans. It can also be synthesized.

References

External links 
 Confusarin at kanaya.naist.jp/knapsack_jsp

Phenanthrenoids
Orchids
Methoxy compounds